The 1981–82 Kansas State Wildcats men's basketball team represented Kansas State University in the 1981-82 NCAA Division I men's basketball season.

Roster

Schedule

|-
!colspan=12 style=| Big 8 Tournament

|-
!colspan=12 style=| NCAA Tournament

Source

References 

Kansas State
Kansas State
Kansas State Wildcats men's basketball seasons
1981 in sports in Kansas
1982 in sports in Kansas